Pakarathinu Pakaram is a 1986 Indian Malayalam film, directed by T Krishna.
It is a remake of Telugu film Pratighatana.

Cast

References

External links
 

1986 films
1980s Malayalam-language films
Malayalam remakes of Telugu films
Films directed by T. Krishna